Herlovsen is a surname. Notable people with the surname include:

Isabell Herlovsen (born 1988), Norwegian footballer
Kai Erik Herlovsen (born 1959), Norwegian footballer and manager

Norwegian-language surnames